The Esporte Clube Pinheiros,  founded on 7 September 1899, by German immigrants, under the name Sport Club Germânia (Sport Club Germany), is a multi-sports and social club located in the Brazilian metropolis São Paulo. The full name of the club is Esporte Clube Pinheiros São Paulo (E.C.P.S.P.). The club's name is commonly abbreviated as E.C. Pinheiros, or E.C.P. It has around 35,000 members, and its terrain comprises 170,000 m² in the well regarded quarter of Jardim Europa. The club's assets are valued to be in excess of R$ 350 million.

Historically, Germânia is the fourth oldest football club of Brazil and was part of the first inter club match of the country. Until 1915 the club had won twice the State Championship of São Paulo.  Already early tennis grew popular among the club members and the club should become one of the co-founders of the Tennis association of São Paulo. Football was basically abandoned with the advent of the professionalization of the sport in the 1930s. During the course of World War II the club abandoned references to its German origin and in 1941 was renamed to Pinheiros.

In later years water polo was very popular. In the 1970s João Carlos de Oliveira from Pinheiros held the world record in the triple jump. In more recent times the club has joined the national elite in basketball and volleyball, in the former even winning international titles. César Cielo won Olympic gold in swimming.

History 

Sport Club Germânia (S.C. Germânia) was one of the clubs which established football in Brazil, and was one of the clubs which participated in 1899, in the first inter-club match, and in 1902, in the first championship match of the country. Germânia was twice the winner of the state championship of São Paulo, the Campeonato Paulista. The eminent player of the early days of the club was Hermann Friese, considered the first football player personality of Brazil. Arthur Friedenreich, the first great star of Brazilian football, and widely acknowledged as one of the all-time greats of the sport, commenced his career at Germânia in 1909.

After abandoning football in the early 1930s, due to the professionalization of the game, the club successfully transformed itself to a universal sports club. Already in 1932, the water sports department sent its first representative to the Olympic Games. Many more athletes from the club since represented Brazil in major international sports events, and swimmers like Gustavo Borges and César Cielo are among the club's Olympic medal winners. The basketball and volleyball teams play in the national top divisions, and the swimmers continue their dominance in Brazil. Beyond this, Pinheiros has departments for many more modalities, such as judo, gymnastics, and tennis.

Since its merger with the Gesellschaft Germania, a social club of German immigrants, in the early 1940s, to form the Esporte Clube Pinheiros, named after the river Rio Pinheiros, flowing close by its seat, the club has also developed as a meeting place and venue for cultural events. These days, thousands of visitors pass daily through the club's restaurants, bars, and other facilities. Top stars of the Brazilian entertainment industry, like Daniela Mercury and Jorge Ben Jor have performed in the club's auditorium, which at its opening in 1957, was the largest of its kind in South America. Also classical music and theatrical plays are regularly on the schedule. Further facilities of the club include a kindergarten, library, and the Centro Pró-Memória Hans Nobiling, which comprises a museum displaying trophies and other memorabilia from the club's rich history, as well as the archives.

Activities

Basketball 

In the 2005–06 season, EC Pinheiros participated for the first time in the professional first division of Brazilian basketball, but then failed to qualify for the single league that resulted from the merging of the conferences. In the 2008–09 season, Pinheiros joined the new top Brazilian league, called the Novo Basquete Brasil, under the sponsored name Pinheiros/Sky. The team plays at the Ginásio Poliesportivo Henrique Villaboim, on the club's grounds in Jardim Europa.

In 2013, the team won its first international title, the most important competition of the Americas, the FIBA Americas League, and thus qualified to play at the 2013 edition of the FIBA Intercontinental Cup, where it lost the series against the EuroLeague champions Olympiacos, of the Greek Basket League.

Handball 

EC Pinheiros is a recognized powerhouse in Brazilian handball, winning the Paulista Championship 30 times including the 2016 edition, the National League 6 times the last time being the 2015 edition and the Pan American Championship twice including the 2017 edition.

The women's team is achieving success recently, winning the 2016 National League.

Judo 
At the Olympic Games 1984 in Los Angeles Douglas Vieira won silver and thus the first Olympic medal for the judoka of Pinheiros. In 2008 Leandro Guilheiro won a bronze medal in judo in the −73 kg class. In London 2012 Rafael Silva won the first bronze medal of the +100 kg category in judo – the tenth Olympic medal in the club's history.

Swimming 
The swimming section from Pinheiros is leading in Brazil. It has won a record 13 times the two main competitions in Brazil, the Maria Lenk Trophy and the José Finkel Trophy.

Manuel dos Santos won 100 m freestyle bronze at the Olympics 1960 in Rome. Freestyle swimmer Gustavo Borges won silver and bronze medals in the Olympics of 1992, 1996 and 2000.
Cesar Cielo won short distance freestyle gold and bronze in 2008 in Beijing.

Tennis 
By 1903, SC Germânia already had its first two tennis courts. In his later years, founding president Hans Nobiling became an enthusiastic tennis player and the club's interest in tennis grew dramatically.  In 1924, SC Germânia won the State's top tennis club honor, the "Taça Brasil", or the Brazil Cup. The club was one of the founders of the state association "Federação Paulista de Tênis." By 1949, the now EC Pinheiros had 14 courts and was the largest tennis facility in Brazil. Today, EC Pinheiros has 24 courts, two of which are covered for play during inclement weather.  Several times, the club has served as the host of matches for the Davis Cup, i.e. – Brazil v. India in 2010. The club's facilities also have served as venue for the Banana Bowl, a Grand Slam -event for junior players between 16 and 18 years of age.

In 1956, Ingrid Metzner from EC Pinheiros, then aged 19, was the first female Brazilian participant at the Wimbledon Championships.

In 2007, the club's tennis association had 3,000 members.

Volleyball 

Brazil is a leading country in volleyball, and the ladies volleyball department is playing in Brazil's first division, the Superliga. In 2010, the men's team played with their sponsored name as Pinheiros/Sky, but the men's team is not active currently. The ladies formed a union with Mackenzie University, and therefore played as Pinheiros/Mackenzie.

Track and field 
Track and field was practically right from the beginning part of SC Germânia. Hermann Friese, who was German Champion over 1500 metres in 1902 and joined Germânia in 1903 was in 1907 Brazil's sole representative at an international tournament in Montevideo, Uruguay where he won two competitions and finished second in a third one. In 1924 Germânia was co-founder of the state athletics association Federação Paulista de Atletismo. By the end of the 1930s the club had a 70 strong group of athletes and dominated track and field in Brazil. Apart from many South-American records it held almost all national records.

At the Games in 1932 in Los Angeles Lúcio de Castro became the first athlete from EC Pinheiros to participate at Olympic Games. In the pole vault he cleared 3,90 metres and finished sixth.

João Carlos de Oliveira won triple jump bronze 1976 in Montreal and 1980 in Moscow. At the 1975 Pan American Games in Mexico he won the long jump with 8.19 metres and surpassed the triple jump world record of Viktor Saneyev by 45 centimetres reaching 17.89 metres. This mark held for almost six years, when the US-American Willie Banks extended it to 17.97  which should stand for ten years. 18 metres should not be exceeded before mid 1995.

Lately the club's athletes lined-up as EC Pinheiro/Asics. Fabiano Peçanha, 2009 South-American champion over 800 metres, and Sabine Heitling, in the same year continental champion over 3000 metres steeplechase, belong to the most successful athletes of the club in more recent years.

Water polo 
Water polo has been played at EC Pinheiros since 1949. Soon players from the club were also selected to play in the national team, and represent Brazil at the Olympic Games and many other international events, such as the 1963 Pan American Games, which was won by Brazil. After winning the Brazilian Cup in 2004, Pinheiros also won the first edition of the national league, the Liga Nacional de Pólo Aquático in 2008.

Honours

Football 
Campeonato Paulista (2): 1906, 1916

References

External links 

Official website 

 
Association football clubs established in 1899
Association football clubs disestablished in 1933
Defunct football clubs in São Paulo (state)
1899 establishments in Brazil
1933 disestablishments in Brazil
Swim teams in Brazil
Water polo clubs in Brazil
Football clubs in São Paulo
Multi-sport clubs in Brazil
German association football clubs outside Germany
Diaspora football clubs in Brazil